Life Word Mission is a South Korean Christian-based new religious movement founded in 1982 by Lee Yo-han (aka: Lee Bok-chil). There is no direct correlation to Yoo Byung-eun's Evangelical Baptist Church.

In South Korea, Life Word Mission is one of several movements commonly known as Guwonpa meaning Salvation Sect, from the Korean term guwon meaning "salvations".

References

External links 

 

Christian new religious movements
Churches in South Korea